The Roderick McIntosh Farm, near Dryhill, Kentucky, dates from 1816.  It was listed on the National Register of Historic Places in 1991.  It has also been known as the W.P. Morton Farm.

The house is a "saddlebag house that tradition holds was constructed
between 1810 and 1830."

References

Log buildings and structures on the National Register of Historic Places in Kentucky
Buildings and structures completed in 1816
National Register of Historic Places in Leslie County, Kentucky
1816 establishments in Kentucky
Farms on the National Register of Historic Places in Kentucky
Double pen architecture in the United States